This list of birds of North Dakota includes species documented in the U.S. state of North Dakota. The list is derived from Checklist of North Dakota Birds produced in April 2021 by the North Dakota Game and Fish Department (NDGFD). The basic NDGFD list contains 420 confirmed and extant species, two extinct species. Three additional species have been added from the North Dakota Bird Records Committee (NDBRC) review list with some additions from Avibase. The combined lists contain 420 species. Of them, 194 and a subspecies are on the review list (see below). The NDGFD list considers 44 species to be accidental, and eight species have been introduced to North America.

This list is presented in the taxonomic sequence of the Check-list of North and Middle American Birds, 7th edition through the 62nd Supplement, published by the American Ornithological Society (AOS). Common and scientific names are also those of the Check-list, except that the common names of families are from the Clements taxonomy because the AOS list does not include them.

Unless otherwise noted, all species listed below are considered to occur regularly in North Dakota as permanent residents, summer or winter visitors, or migrants. The tags below are used to annotate some species. There is much overlap among the (A), (R), and (H) categories.

(A) Accidental - species on the NDGFD checklist which "are not likely to occur in the state again, or may occur infrequently"
(R) Review list - birds that if seen require more comprehensive documentation than regularly seen species. These birds are considered irregular or rare in North Dakota.
(I) Introduced - a species established in North America as a result of human action
(E) Extinct - a recent species that no longer exists

Ducks, geese, and waterfowl

Order: AnseriformesFamily: Anatidae

The family Anatidae includes the ducks and most duck-like waterfowl, such as geese and swans. These birds are adapted to an aquatic existence with webbed feet, bills which are flattened to a greater or lesser extent, and feathers that are excellent at shedding water due to special oils. Forty-three species have been recorded in North Dakota.

Black-bellied whistling-duck, Dendrocygna autumnalis (A) (R)
Fulvous whistling-duck, Dendrocygna bicolor (A) (R)
Snow goose, Anser caerulescens
Ross's goose, Anser rossii
Greater white-fronted goose, Anser albifrons
Brant, Branta bernicla (A) (R)
Cackling goose, Branta hutchinsii
Canada goose, Branta canadensis
Trumpeter swan, Cygnus buccinator (A) (R) (extirpated)
Tundra swan, Cygnus columbianus
Wood duck, Aix sponsa
Mandarin duck, Aix galericulata (I)
Garganey, Spatula querquedula (A) (R)
Blue-winged teal, Spatula discors
Cinnamon teal, Spatula cyanoptera (R) (nesting)
Northern shoveler, Spatula clypeata
Gadwall, Mareca strepera
Eurasian wigeon, Mareca penelope (A) (R)
American wigeon, Mareca americana
Mallard, Anas platyrhynchos
American black duck, Anas rubripes (R) (nesting)
Mottled duck, Anas fulvigula (A) (R)
Northern pintail, Anas acuta
Green-winged teal, Anas crecca
Canvasback, Aythya valisineria
Redhead, Aythya americana
Ring-necked duck, Aythya collaris
Greater scaup, Aythya marila
Lesser scaup, Aythya affinis
King eider, Somateria spectabilis (A) (R)
Common eider, Somateria mollissima (A) (R)
Harlequin duck, Histrionicus histrionicus (A) (R)
Surf scoter, Melanitta perspicillata (R) (spring or summer)
White-winged scoter, Melanitta deglandi (R) (spring or summer)
Black scoter, Melanitta americana (R) (spring or summer)
Long-tailed duck, Clangula hyemalis (R) (summer)
Bufflehead, Bucephala albeola (R) (nesting outside of the Turtle Mountains)
Common goldeneye, Bucephala clangula (R) (nesting outside of the Turtle Mountains)
Barrow's goldeneye, Bucephala islandica (A) (R)
Hooded merganser, Lophodytes cucullatus
Common merganser, Mergus merganser (R) (nesting other than along the Missouri River)
Red-breasted merganser, Mergus serrator
Ruddy duck, Oxyura jamaicensis

Pheasants, grouse, and allies
Order: GalliformesFamily: Phasianidae

Phasianidae consists of the pheasants and their allies. These are terrestrial species, variable in size but generally plump with broad relatively short wings. Many species are gamebirds or have been domesticated as a food source for humans. Eight species have been recorded in North Dakota.

Wild turkey, Meleagris gallopavo
Ruffed grouse, Bonasa umbellus
Greater sage-grouse, Centrocercus urophasianus
Willow ptarmigan, Lagopus lagopus (A) (R)
Sharp-tailed grouse, Tympanuchus phasianellus
Greater prairie-chicken, Tympanuchus cupido
Gray partridge, Perdix perdix (I)
Ring-necked pheasant, Phasianus colchicus (I)

Grebes

Order: PodicipediformesFamily: Podicipedidae

Grebes are small to medium-large freshwater diving birds. They have lobed toes and are excellent swimmers and divers. However, they have their feet placed far back on the body, making them quite ungainly on land. Six species have been recorded in North Dakota.

Pied-billed grebe, Podilymbus podiceps
Horned grebe, Podiceps auritus
Red-necked grebe, Podiceps grisegena
Eared grebe, Podiceps nigricollis
Western grebe, Aechmorphorus occidentalis
Clark's grebe, Aechmophorus clarkii (R) (nesting)

Pigeons and doves
Order: ColumbiformesFamily: Columbidae

Pigeons and doves are stout-bodied birds with short necks and short slender bills with a fleshy cere. Seven species have been recorded in North Dakota.

Rock pigeon, Columba livia (I)
Band-tailed pigeon, Patagioenas fasciata (A) (R)
Eurasian collared dove, Streptopelia decaocto (I)
Passenger pigeon, Ectopistes migratorius (E)
Inca dove, Columbina inca (A) (R)
White-winged dove, Zenaida asiatica (A) (R)
Mourning dove, Zenaida macroura

Cuckoos
Order: CuculiformesFamily: Cuculidae

The family Cuculidae includes cuckoos, roadrunners, and anis. These birds are of variable size with slender bodies, long tails, and strong legs. Three species have been recorded in North Dakota.

Groove-billed ani, Crotophaga sulcirostris (A) (R)
Yellow-billed cuckoo, Coccyzus americanus (R) (nesting)
Black-billed cuckoo, Coccyzus erythropthalmus

Nightjars and allies

Order: CaprimulgiformesFamily: Caprimulgidae

Nightjars are medium-sized nocturnal birds that usually nest on the ground. They have long wings, short legs, and very short bills. Most have small feet, of little use for walking, and long pointed wings. Their soft plumage is cryptically colored to resemble bark or leaves. Three species have been recorded in North Dakota.

Common nighthawk,  Chordeiles minor
Common poorwill,  Phalaenoptilus nuttallii (R) (east of Hwy 85)
Eastern whip-poor-will, Antrostomus vociferus (R) (nesting and all those west of ND Hwy 1)

Swifts
Order: ApodiformesFamily: Apodidae

The swifts are small birds which spend the majority of their lives flying. These birds have very short legs and never settle voluntarily on the ground, perching instead only on vertical surfaces. Many swifts have very long, swept-back wings which resemble a crescent or boomerang. One species has been recorded in North Dakota.

Chimney swift, Chaetura pelagica

Hummingbirds
Order: ApodiformesFamily: Trochilidae

Hummingbirds are small birds capable of hovering in mid-air due to the rapid flapping of their wings. They are the only birds that can fly backwards. Five species have been recorded in North Dakota.

Ruby-throated hummingbird, Archilochus colubris
Black-chinned hummingbird, Archilochus alexandri ((A) (R)
Calliope hummingbird, Selasphorus calliope ((A) (R)
Rufous hummingbird, Selasphorus rufus ((A) (R)
Broad-tailed hummingbird, Selasphorus platycercus ((A) (R)

Rails, gallinules, and coots

Order: GruiformesFamily: Rallidae

Rallidae is a large family of small to medium-sized birds which includes the rails, crakes, coots, and gallinules. The most typical family members occupy dense vegetation in damp environments near lakes, swamps, or rivers. In general they are shy and secretive birds, making them difficult to observe. Most species have strong legs and long toes which are well adapted to soft uneven surfaces. They tend to have short, rounded wings and tend to be weak fliers. Seven species have been recorded in North Dakota.

King rail, Rallus elegans (A) (R)
Virginia rail, Rallus limicola (R) (winter)
Sora, Porzana carolina
Common gallinule, Gallinula galeata(A) (R)
American coot, Fulica americana
Yellow rail, Coturnicops noveboracensis (R) (nesting)
Black rail, Laterallus jamaicensis (A) (R)

Cranes
Order: GruiformesFamily: Gruidae

Cranes are large, long-legged, and long-necked birds. Unlike the similar-looking but unrelated herons, cranes fly with necks outstretched, not pulled back. Most have elaborate and noisy courting displays or "dances". Three species have been recorded in North Dakota.

Sandhill crane, Antigone canadensis (R) (nesting)
Common crane, Grus grus (A) (R)
Whooping crane, Grus americana (R) (summer)

Stilts and avocets

Order: CharadriiformesFamily: Recurvirostridae

Recurvirostridae is a family of large wading birds which includes the avocets and stilts. The avocets have long legs and long up-curved bills. The stilts have extremely long legs and long, thin, straight bills. Two species have been recorded in North Dakota.

Black-necked stilt, Himantopus mexicanus
American avocet, Recurvirostra americana

Plovers and lapwings

Order: CharadriiformesFamily: Charadriidae

The family Charadriidae includes the plovers, dotterels, and lapwings. They are small to medium-sized birds with compact bodies, short thick necks, and long, usually pointed, wings. They are found in open country worldwide, mostly in habitats near water. Seven species have been recorded in North Dakota.

Black-bellied plover, Pluvialis squatarola
American golden-plover, Pluvialis dominica
Killdeer, Charadrius vociferus
Semipalmated plover, Charadrius semipalmatus
Piping plover, Charadrius melodus
Snowy plover, Charadrius nivosus (A) (R)
Mountain plover, Charadrius montanus (A) (R)

Sandpipers and allies

Order: CharadriiformesFamily: Scolopacidae

Scolopacidae is a large diverse family of small to medium-sized shorebirds including the sandpipers, curlews, godwits, shanks, tattlers, woodcocks, snipes, dowitchers, and phalaropes. The majority of these species eat small invertebrates picked out of the mud or soil. Different lengths of legs and bills enable multiple species to feed in the same habitat, particularly on the coast, without direct competition for food. Thirty-four species have been recorded in North Dakota.

Upland sandpiper, Bartramia longicauda
Whimbrel, Numenius phaeopus (A) (R)
Eskimo curlew, Numenius borealis (E)
Long-billed curlew, Numenius americanus
Hudsonian godwit, Limosa haemastica
Marbled godwit, Limosa fedoa
Ruddy turnstone, Arenaria interpres
Red knot, Calidris canutus
Ruff, Calidris pugnax (A) (R)
Sharp-tailed sandpiper, Calidris acuminata(A) (R)
Stilt sandpiper, Calidris himantopus
Curlew sandpiper, Calidris ferruginea (A) (R)
Sanderling, Calidris alba
Dunlin, Calidris alpina
Baird's sandpiper, Calidris bairdii
Little stint, Calidris minuta (A) (R)
Least sandpiper, Calidris minutilla
White-rumped sandpiper, Calidris fuscicollis
Buff-breasted sandpiper, Calidris subruficollis
Pectoral sandpiper, Calidris melanotos
Semipalmated sandpiper, Calidris pusilla
Western sandpiper, Calidris mauri (A) (R)
Short-billed dowitcher, Limnodromus griseus
Long-billed dowitcher, Limnodromus scolopaceus
American woodcock, Scolopax minor (R) (nesting west of US Highway 83)
Wilson's snipe, Gallinago delicata
Spotted sandpiper, Actitis macularius
Solitary sandpiper, Tringa solitaria
Lesser yellowlegs, Tringa flavipes
Willet, Tringa semipalmata
Greater yellowlegs, Tringa melanoleuca
Wilson's phalarope, Phalaropus tricolor
Red-necked phalarope, Phalaropus lobatus
Red phalarope, Phalaropus fulicarius (A) (R)

Skuas and jaegers
Order: CharadriiformesFamily: Stercorariidae

Skuas and jaegers are in general medium to large birds, typically with gray or brown plumage, often with white markings on the wings. They have longish bills with hooked tips and webbed feet with sharp claws. They look like large dark gulls, but have a fleshy cere above the upper mandible. They are strong, acrobatic fliers. Three species have been recorded in North Dakota.

South polar skua, Stercorarius maccormicki (A) (R) 
Pomarine jaeger, Stercorarius pomarinus (A) (R) (see note)
Parasitic jaeger, Stercorarius parasiticus (A) (R)
Long-tailed jaeger, Stercorarius longicaudus (A) (R)

Gulls, terns, and skimmers

Order: CharadriiformesFamily: Laridae

Laridae is a family of medium to large seabirds and includes gulls, terns, kittiwakes, and skimmers. They are typically gray or white, often with black markings on the head or wings. They have stout, longish bills and webbed feet. Twenty-two species have been recorded in North Dakota.

Black-legged kittiwake, Rissa tridactyla (R) (except those at Garrison Dam)
Sabine's gull, Xema sabini
Bonaparte's gull, Chroicocephalus philadelphia
Little gull, Hydrocoloeus minutus (A) (R)
Ross's gull, Rhodostethia rosea (A) (R)
Laughing gull, Leucophaeus atricilla (A) (R)
Franklin's gull, Leucophaeus pipixcan
Short-billed gull, Larus brachyrhynchus (A) (R)
Ring-billed gull, Larus delawarensis
California gull, Larus californicus
Herring gull, Larus argentatus
Iceland gull, Larus glaucoides
Lesser black-backed gull, Larus fuscus
Glaucous-winged gull, Larus glaucescens (A) (R)
Glaucous gull, Larus hyperboreus
Great black-backed gull, Larus marinus (A) (R)
Least tern, Sternula antillarum (R) (except those along Missouri River)
Caspian tern, Hydroprogne caspia
Black tern, Chlidonias niger
Common tern, Sterna hirundo
Arctic tern, Sterna paradisaea (A) (R)
Forster's tern, Sterna forsteri

Loons
Order: GaviiformesFamily: Gaviidae

Loons are aquatic birds the size of a large duck, to which they are unrelated. Their plumage is largely gray or black, and they have spear-shaped bills. Loons swim well and fly adequately, but are almost hopeless on land, because their legs are placed towards the rear of the body. Five species have been recorded in North Dakota.

Red-throated loon, Gavia stellata (A) (R)
Arctic loon, Gavia arctica (A) (R)
Pacific loon, Gavia pacifica (A) (R)
Common loon, Gavia immer (R) (nesting outside of the Turtle Mountains)
Yellow-billed loon, Gavia adamsii (A) (R)

Storks
Order: CiconiiformesFamily: Ciconiidae

Storks are large, heavy, long-legged, long-necked wading birds with long stout bills and wide wingspans. They lack the powder down that other wading birds such as herons, spoonbills, and ibises use to clean off fish slime. Storks lack a pharynx and are mute. One species has been recorded in North Dakota.

Wood stork, Mycteria americana (A) (R)

Boobies and gannets
Order: SuliformesFamily: Sulidae

The sulids comprise the gannets and boobies. Both groups are medium-large coastal seabirds that plunge-dive for fish. One species has been recorded in North Dakota.

Northern gannet, Morus bassanus (A) (R)

Cormorants and shags
Order: SuliformesFamily: Phalacrocoracidae

Cormorants are medium-to-large aquatic birds, usually with mainly dark plumage and areas of colored skin on the face. The bill is long, thin, and sharply hooked. Their feet are four-toed and webbed. One species has been recorded in North Dakota.

Double-crested cormorant, Nannopterum auritum

Pelicans

Order: PelecaniformesFamily: Pelecanidae

Pelicans are very large water birds with a distinctive pouch under their beak. Like other birds in the order Pelecaniformes, they have four webbed toes. Two species have been recorded in North Dakota.

American white pelican, Pelecanus erythrorhynchos
Brown pelican, Pelecanus occidentalis (A) (R)

Herons, egrets, and bitterns

Order: PelecaniformesFamily: Ardeidae

The family Ardeidae contains the herons, egrets, and bitterns. Herons and egrets are medium to large wading birds with long necks and legs. Bitterns tend to be shorter necked and more secretive. Members of Ardeidae fly with their necks retracted, unlike other long-necked birds such as storks, ibises, and spoonbills. Eleven species have been recorded in North Dakota.

American bittern, Botaurus lentiginosus
Least bittern, Ixobrychus exilis (R) (west of US Hwy 83 and all nesting records)
Great blue heron, Ardea herodias
Great egret, Ardea alba
Snowy egret, Egretta thula
Little blue heron, Egretta caerulea (R) (sightings and nesting)
Tricolored heron, Egretta tricolor (A) (R)
Cattle egret, Bubulcus ibis
Green heron, Butorides virescens (R) (west of US Hwy 83 and all nesting records)
Black-crowned night-heron Nycticorax nycticorax
Yellow-crowned night-heron, Nyctanassa violacea (R)

Ibises and spoonbills
Order: PelecaniformesFamily: Threskiornithidae

The family Threskiornithidae includes the ibises and spoonbills. They have long, broad wings. Their bodies tend to be elongated, the neck more so, with rather long legs. The bill is also long, decurved in the case of the ibises, straight and distinctively flattened in the spoonbills. Three species have been recorded in North Dakota.

White ibis, Eudocimus albus (A) (R)
Glossy ibis, Plegadis falcinellus (A) (R)
White-faced ibis, Plegadis chihi

New World vultures
Order: CathartiformesFamily: Cathartidae

The New World vultures are not closely related to Old World vultures, but superficially resemble them because of convergent evolution. Like the Old World vultures, they are scavengers, however, unlike Old World vultures, which find carcasses by sight, New World vultures have a good sense of smell with which they locate carcasses. One species has been recorded in North Dakota.

Turkey vulture, Cathartes aura

Osprey
Order: AccipitriformesFamily: Pandionidae

Pandionidae is a family of fish-eating birds of prey possessing a very large, powerful hooked beak for tearing flesh from their prey, strong legs, powerful talons, and keen eyesight. The family is monotypic.

Osprey, Pandion haliaetus (R) (nesting)

Hawks, eagles, and kites

Order: AccipitriformesFamily: Accipitridae

Accipitridae is a family of birds of prey which includes hawks, eagles, kites, harriers, and Old World vultures. These birds have very large powerful hooked beaks for tearing flesh from their prey, strong legs, powerful talons, and keen eyesight. Fifteen species have been recorded in North Dakota.

White-tailed kite, Elanus leucurus (A) (R)
Swallow-tailed kite, Elanoides forficatus (A) (R)
Golden eagle, Aquila chrysaetos
Mississippi kite, Ictinia mississippiensis (A) (R)
Northern harrier, Circus hudsonius
Sharp-shinned hawk, Accipiter striatus (R) (nesting)
Cooper's hawk, Accipiter cooperii
Northern goshawk, Accipiter gentilis (R) (nesting)
Bald eagle, Haliaeetus leucocephalus
Red-shouldered hawk, Buteo lineatus (R)
Broad-winged hawk, Buteo platypterus
Swainson's hawk, Buteo swainsoni
Red-tailed hawk, Buteo jamaicensis
Rough-legged hawk, Buteo lagopus (R) (summer)
Ferruginous hawk, Buteo regalis

Barn-owls
Order: StrigiformesFamily: Tytonidae

Barn-owls are medium to large owls with large heads and characteristic heart-shaped faces. They have long strong legs with powerful talons. One species has been recorded in North Dakota.

Barn owl, Tyto alba

Owls
Order: StrigiformesFamily: Strigidae

Typical owls are small to large solitary nocturnal birds of prey. They have large forward-facing eyes and ears, a hawk-like beak, and a conspicuous circle of feathers around each eye called a facial disk. Eleven species have been recorded in North Dakota.

Eastern screech-owl, Megascops asio
Great horned owl, Bubo virginianus
Snowy owl, Bubo scandiacus
Northern hawk owl, Surnia ulula (R)
Burrowing owl, Athene cunicularia
Barred owl, Strix varia (R) (nesting and all those west of ND Hwy 281)
Great gray owl, Strix nebulosa (R)
Long-eared owl, Asio otus
Short-eared owl, Asio flammeus
Boreal owl, Aegolius funereus (R)
Northern saw-whet owl, Aegolius acadicus (R) (nesting)

Kingfishers
Order: CoraciiformesFamily: Alcedinidae

Kingfishers are medium-sized birds with large heads, long, pointed bills, short legs, and stubby tails. One species has been recorded in North Dakota.

Belted kingfisher, Megaceryle alcyon

Woodpeckers
Order: PiciformesFamily: Picidae

Woodpeckers are small to medium-sized birds with chisel-like beaks, short legs, stiff tails, and long tongues used for capturing insects. Some species have feet with two toes pointing forward and two backward, while several species have only three toes. Many woodpeckers have the habit of tapping noisily on tree trunks with their beaks. Eleven species have been recorded in North Dakota.

Lewis's woodpecker, Melanerpes lewis (A) (R)
Red-headed woodpecker, Melanerpes erythrocephalus
Acorn woodpecker, Melanerpes formicivorus (A) (R)
Red-bellied woodpecker, Melanerpes carolinus (R) (nesting except along the Sheyenne River)
Yellow-bellied sapsucker, Sphyrapicus varius
American three-toed woodpecker, Picoides dorsalis (R) (see note)
Black-backed woodpecker, Picoides arcticus (R)
Downy woodpecker, Dryobates pubescens
Hairy woodpecker, Dryobates villosus
Northern flicker, Colaptes auratus
Pileated woodpecker, Dryocopus pileatus (R) (nesting west of ND 3 except for the Turtle Mountains)

Falcons and caracaras

Order: FalconiformesFamily: Falconidae

Falconidae is a family of diurnal birds of prey, notably the falcons and caracaras. They differ from hawks, eagles, and kites in that they kill with their beaks instead of their talons. Six species have been recorded in North Dakota.

Crested caracara, Caracara plancus (A) (R)
American kestrel, Falco sparverius
Merlin, Falco columbarius
Gyrfalcon, Falco rusticolus
Peregrine falcon, Falco peregrinus
Prairie falcon, Falco mexicanus

Tyrant flycatchers
Order: PasseriformesFamily: Tyrannidae

Tyrant flycatchers are Passerine birds which occur throughout North and South America. They superficially resemble the Old World flycatchers, but are more robust and have stronger bills. They do not have the sophisticated vocal capabilities of the songbirds. Most, but not all, are rather plain. As the name implies, most are insectivorous. Nineteen species have been recorded in North Dakota.

White-crested elaenia, Elaenia albiceps (A) (R)
Great crested flycatcher, Myiarchus crinitus
Cassin's kingbird, Tyrannus vociferans (A) (R)
Thick-billed  kingbird, Tyrannus crassirostris (A) (R)
Western kingbird, Tyrannus verticalis
Eastern kingbird, Tyrannus tyrannus
Scissor-tailed flycatcher, Tyrannus forficatus (A) (R)
Olive-sided flycatcher, Contopus cooperi
Western wood-pewee, Contopus sordidulus (R) (nesting)
Eastern wood-pewee, Contopus virens
Yellow-bellied flycatcher, Empidonax flaviventris
Acadian flycatcher, Empidonax virescens (A) (R)
Alder flycatcher, Empidonax alnorum (R) (nesting)
Willow flycatcher, Empidonax traillii
Least flycatcher, Empidonax minimus
Hammond's flycatcher, Empidonax hammondii (A) (R)
Eastern phoebe, Sayornis phoebe
Say's phoebe, Sayornis saya
Vermilion flycatcher, Pyrocephalus rubinus (R)

Vireos, shirke-babblers, and erpornis
Order: PasseriformesFamily: Vireonidae

The vireos are a group of small to medium-sized passerine birds. They are typically greenish in color and resemble wood-warblers apart from their heavier bills. Nine species have been recorded in North Dakota.

White-eyed vireo, Vireo griseus (A) (R)
Bell's vireo, Vireo bellii (R) (nesting)
Yellow-throated vireo, Vireo flavifrons
Cassin's vireo, Vireo cassinii (A) (R)
Blue-headed vireo, Vireo solitarius (R) (nesting)
Plumbeous vireo, Vireo plumbeus (A) (R)
Philadelphia vireo, Vireo philadelphicus (R) (nesting)
Warbling vireo, Vireo gilvus
Red-eyed vireo, Vireo olivaceus

Shrikes
Order: PasseriformesFamily: Laniidae

Shrikes are passerine birds known for their habit of catching other birds and small animals and impaling the uneaten portions of their bodies on thorns. A shrike's beak is hooked, like that of a typical bird of prey. Two species have been recorded in North Dakota.

Loggerhead shrike, Lanius ludovicianus (R) (winter)
Northern shrike, Lanius borealis

Crows, jays, and magpies
Order: PasseriformesFamily: Corvidae

The family Corvidae includes crows, ravens, jays, choughs, magpies, treepies, nutcrackers, and ground jays. Corvids are above average in size among the Passeriformes, and some of the larger species show high levels of intelligence. Seven species have been recorded in North Dakota.

Canada jay, Perisoreus canadensis
Pinyon jay, Gymnorhinus cyanocephalus (A) (R)
Blue jay, Cyanocitta cristata
Clark's nutcracker, Nucifraga columbiana (R)
Black-billed magpie, Pica hudsonia
American crow, Corvus brachyrhynchos
Common raven, Corvus corax (R) (nesting)

Tits, chickadees, and titmice
Order: PasseriformesFamily: Paridae

The Paridae are mainly small stocky woodland species with short stout bills. Some have crests. They are adaptable birds, with a mixed diet including seeds and insects. Three species have been recorded in North Dakota.

Black-capped chickadee, Poecile atricapilla
Boreal chickadee, Poecile hudsonica (A) (R)
Tufted titmouse, Baeolophus bicolor (A) (R)

Larks
Order: PasseriformesFamily: Alaudidae

Larks are small terrestrial birds with often extravagant songs and display flights. Most larks are fairly dull in appearance. Their food is insects and seeds. One species has been recorded in North Dakota.

Horned lark, Eremophila alpestris

Swallows
Order: PasseriformesFamily: Hirundinidae

The family Hirundinidae is adapted to aerial feeding. They have a slender streamlined body, long pointed wings, and a short bill with a wide gape. The feet are adapted to perching rather than walking, and the front toes are partially joined at the base. Seven species have been recorded in North Dakota.

Bank swallow, Riparia riparia
Tree swallow, Tachycineta bicolor
Violet-green swallow, Tachycineta thalassina
Northern rough-winged swallow, Stelgidopteryx serripennis
Purple martin, Progne subis
Barn swallow, Hirundo rustica
Cliff swallow, Petrochelidon pyrrhonota

Kinglets
Order: PasseriformesFamily: Regulidae

The kinglets are a small family of birds which resemble the titmice. They are very small insectivorous birds. The adults have colored crowns, giving rise to their names. Two species have been recorded in North Dakota.

Ruby-crowned kinglet, Corthylio calendula (R) (nesting)
Golden-crowned kinglet, Regulus satrapa (R) (nesting)

Waxwings
Order: PasseriformesFamily: Bombycillidae

The waxwings are a group of passerine birds with soft silky plumage and unique red tips to some of the wing feathers. In the Bohemian and cedar waxwings, these tips look like sealing wax and give the group its name. These are arboreal birds of northern forests. They live on insects in summer and berries in winter. Two species have been recorded in North Dakota.

Bohemian waxwing, Bombycilla garrulus
Cedar waxwing, Bombycilla cedrorum

Nuthatches
Order: PasseriformesFamily: Sittidae

Nuthatches are small woodland birds. They have the unusual ability to climb down trees head first, unlike other birds which can only go upwards. Nuthatches have big heads, short tails, and powerful bills and feet. Three species have been recorded in North Dakota.

Red-breasted nuthatch, Sitta canadensis
White-breasted nuthatch, Sitta carolinensis
Pygmy nuthatch, Sitta pygmaea (A) (R)

Treecreepers
Order: PasseriformesFamily: Certhiidae

Treecreepers are small woodland birds, brown above and white below. They have thin pointed down-curved bills, which they use to extricate insects from bark. They have stiff tail feathers, like woodpeckers, which they use to support themselves on vertical trees. One species has been recorded in North Dakota.

Brown creeper, Certhia americana (R) (nesting)

Gnatcatchers
Order: PasseriformesFamily: Polioptilidae

These dainty birds resemble Old World warblers in their structure and habits, moving restlessly through the foliage seeking insects. The gnatcatchers are mainly soft bluish gray in color and have the typical insectivore's long sharp bill. Many species have distinctive black head patterns (especially males) and long, regularly cocked, black-and-white tails. One species has been recorded in North Dakota.

Blue-gray gnatcatcher, Polioptila caerulea (R) (sightings and nesting)

Wrens
Order: PasseriformesFamily: Troglodytidae

Wrens are small and inconspicuous birds, except for their loud songs. They have short wings and thin down-turned bills. Several species often hold their tails upright. All are insectivorous. Eight species have been recorded in North Dakota.

Rock wren, Salpinctes obsoletus (R) (nesting east of US 83)
Canyon wren, Catherpes mexicanus (A) (R)
House wren, Troglodytes aedon
Winter wren, Troglodytes hiemalis
Sedge wren, Cistothorus platensis
Marsh wren, Cistothorus palustris
Carolina wren, Thryothorus ludovicianus (R)
Bewick's wren, Thryomanes bewickii (A) (R)

Mockingbirds and thrashers
Order: PasseriformesFamily: Mimidae

The mimids are a family of passerine birds which includes thrashers, mockingbirds, tremblers and the New World catbirds. These birds are notable for their vocalization, especially their remarkable ability to mimic a wide variety of birds and other sounds heard outdoors. The species tend towards dull grays and browns in their appearance. Four species have been recorded in North Dakota.

Gray catbird, Dumetella carolinensis
Brown thrasher, Toxostoma rufum
Sage thrasher, Oreoscoptes montanus (R)
Northern mockingbird, Mimus polyglottos

Starlings
Order: PasseriformesFamily: Sturnidae

Starlings are small to medium-sized passerine birds. They are medium-sized passerines with strong feet. Their flight is strong and direct and they are very gregarious. Their preferred habitat is fairly open country, and they eat insects and fruit. Plumage is typically dark with a metallic sheen. One species has been recorded in North Dakota.

European starling, Sturnus vulgaris (I)

Thrushes and allies
Order: PasseriformesFamily: Turdidae

The thrushes are a group of passerine birds that occur mainly but not exclusively in the Old World. They are plump, soft plumaged, small to medium-sized insectivores or sometimes omnivores, often feeding on the ground. Many have attractive songs. Eleven species have been recorded in North Dakota.

Eastern bluebird, Sialia sialis
Western bluebird, Sialia mexicana (R)
Mountain bluebird, Sialia currucoides
Townsend's solitaire, Myadestes townsendi
Veery, Catharus fuscescens
Gray-cheeked thrush, Catharus minimus
Swainson's thrush, Catharus ustulatus
Hermit thrush, Catharus guttatus
Wood thrush, Hylocichla mustelina (R) (nesting)
American robin, Turdus migratorius
Varied thrush, Ixoreus naevius

Old World flycatchers
Order: PasseriformesFamily: Muscicapidae

Old World flycatchers are a large family of small passerine birds. These are mainly small arboreal insectivores, many of which, as the name implies, take their prey on the wing. One species has been recorded in North Dakota.

Northern wheatear, Oenanthe oenanthe (R) (see note)

Old World sparrows

Order: PasseriformesFamily: Passeridae

Old World sparrows are small passerine birds. In general, sparrows tend to be small plump brownish or grayish birds with short tails and short powerful beaks. Sparrows are seed eaters, but they also consume small insects. Two species have been recorded in North Dakota.

House sparrow, Passer domesticus (I)
Eurasian tree sparrow, Passer montanus (I)

Wagtails and pipits
Order: PasseriformesFamily: Motacillidae

Motacillidae is a family of small passerine birds with medium to long tails. They include the wagtails, longclaws, and pipits. They are slender ground-feeding insectivores of open country. Two species have been recorded in North Dakota.

American pipit, Anthus rubescens
Sprague's pipit, Anthus spragueii

Finches, euphonias, and allies
Order: PasseriformesFamily: Fringillidae

Finches are seed-eating passerine birds, that are small to moderately large and have a strong beak, usually conical and in some species very large. All have twelve tail feathers and nine primaries. These birds have a bouncing flight with alternating bouts of flapping and gliding on closed wings, and most sing well. Fourteen species have been recorded in North Dakota.

Brambling, Fringilla montifringilla (R)
Evening grosbeak, Coccothraustes vespertinus
Pine grosbeak, Pinicola enucleator
Gray-crowned rosy-finch, Leucosticte tephrocotis (R) (east of ND Hwy 85)
House finch, Haemorhous mexicanus
Purple finch, Haemorhous purpureus
Cassin's finch, Haemorhous cassinii (A) (R)
Common redpoll, Acanthis flammea
Hoary redpoll, Acanthis hornemanni
Red crossbill, Loxia curvirostra (R) (nesting)
White-winged crossbill, Loxia leucoptera (R) (nesting)
Pine siskin, Spinus pinus
Lesser goldfinch, Spinus psaltria (A) (R)
American goldfinch, Spinus tristis

Longspurs and snow buntings
Order: PasseriformesFamily: Calcariidae

The Calcariidae are a group of passerine birds that were traditionally grouped with the New World sparrows, but differ in a number of respects and are usually found in open grassy areas. Five species have been recorded in North Dakota.

Lapland longspur, Calcarius lapponicus
Chestnut-collared longspur, Calcarius ornatus
Smith's longspur, Calcarius pictus
Thick-billed longspur, Rhyncophanes mccownii (R) (other than at “Rhame Prairie”)
Snow bunting, Plectrophenax nivalis

New World sparrows
Order: PasseriformesFamily: Passerellidae

Until 2017, these species were considered part of the family Emberizidae. Most of the species are known as sparrows, but these birds are not closely related to the Old World sparrows which are in the family Passeridae. Many of these have distinctive head patterns. Twenty-seven species have been recorded in North Dakota.

Grasshopper sparrow, Ammodramus savannarum
Black-throated sparrow, Amphispiza bilineata (R)
Lark sparrow, Chondestes grammacus
Lark bunting, Calamospiza melanocorys
Chipping sparrow, Spizella passerina
Clay-colored sparrow, Spizella pallida
Field sparrow, Spizella pusilla
Brewer's sparrow, Spizella breweri (R) (east of US Hwy 85 or north of Interstate 94)
Fox sparrow, Passerella iliaca (R) (all subspecies except ”red”)
American tree sparrow, Spizelloides arborea
Dark-eyed junco, Junco hyemalis (R) (“white-winged” and “gray-headed” subspecies)
White-crowned sparrow, Zonotrichia leucophrys
Golden-crowned sparrow, Zonotrichia atricapilla (A) (R)
Harris's sparrow, Zonotrichia querula
White-throated sparrow, Zonotrichia albicollis
Vesper sparrow, Pooecetes gramineus
LeConte's sparrow, Ammospiza leconteii
Nelson's sparrow, Ammospiza nelsoni
Baird's sparrow, Centronyx bairdii
Henslow's sparrow, Centronyx henslowii (R)
Savannah sparrow, Passerculus sandwichensis
Song sparrow, Melospiza melodia
Lincoln's sparrow, Melospiza lincolnii
Swamp sparrow, Melospiza georgiana
Green-tailed towhee, Pipilo chlorurus (A) (R)
Spotted towhee, Pipilo maculatus
Eastern towhee, Pipilo erythrophthalmus

Yellow-breasted chat
Order: PasseriformesFamily: Icteriidae

This species was historically placed in the wood-warblers (Parulidae) but nonetheless most authorities were unsure if it belonged there. It was placed in its own family in 2017.

Yellow-breasted chat, Icteria virens

Troupials and allies
Order: PasseriformesFamily: Icteridae

The icterids are a group of small to medium-sized, often colorful passerine birds restricted to the New World and include the grackles, New World blackbirds, and New World orioles. Most species have black as a predominant plumage color, often enlivened by yellow, orange, or red. Thirteen species have been recorded in North Dakota.

Yellow-headed blackbird, Xanthocephalus xanthocephalus
Bobolink, Dolichonyx oryzivorus
Eastern meadowlark, Sturnella magna (A) (R)
Western meadowlark, Sturnella neglecta
Orchard oriole, Icterus spurius
Bullock's oriole, Icterus bullockii (R) (east of US Hwy 83)
Baltimore oriole, Icterus galbula
Red-winged blackbird, Agelaius phoeniceus
Brown-headed cowbird, Molothrus ater
Rusty blackbird, Euphagus carolinus
Brewer's blackbird, Euphagus cyanocephalus
Common grackle, Quiscalus quiscula
Great-tailed grackle, Quiscalus mexicanus (A) (R)

New World warblers
Order: PasseriformesFamily: Parulidae

The wood-warblers are a group of small often colorful passerine birds restricted to the New World. Most are arboreal, but some like the ovenbird and the two waterthrushes, are more terrestrial. Most members of this family are insectivores. Thirty-seven species have been recorded in North Dakota.

Ovenbird, Seiurus aurocapilla
Worm-eating warbler, Helmitheros vermivorum (A) (R)
Louisiana waterthrush, Parkesia motacilla (A) (R)
Northern waterthrush, Parkesia noveboracensis (R)  (nesting outside of Turtle Mountains)
Golden-winged warbler, Vermivora chrysoptera (R) (nesting)
Blue-winged warbler, Vermivora cyanoptera (A) (R)
Black-and-white warbler, Mniotilta varia
Prothonotary warbler, Protonotaria citrea (A) (R)
Tennessee warbler, Leiothlypis peregrina (R) (nesting)
Orange-crowned warbler, Leiothlypis celata (R) (nesting)
Nashville warbler, Leiothlypis ruficapilla (R) (nesting)
Connecticut warbler, Oporornis agilis
MacGillivray's warbler, Geothlypis tolmiei (R)
Mourning warbler, Geothlypis philadelphia
Kentucky warbler, Geothlypis formosa (A) (R)
Common yellowthroat, Geothlypis trichas
Hooded warbler, Setophaga citrina (A) (R)
American redstart, Setophaga ruticilla
Cape May warbler, Setophaga tigrina
Cerulean warbler, Setophaga cerulea (R)
Northern parula, Setophaga americana
Magnolia warbler, Setophaga magnolia
Bay-breasted warbler, Setophaga castanea
Blackburnian warbler, Setophaga fusca
Yellow warbler, Setophaga petechia
Chestnut-sided warbler, Setophaga pensylvanica
Blackpoll warbler, Setophaga striata
Black-throated blue warbler, Setophaga caerulescens
Palm warbler, Setophaga palmarum
Pine warbler, Setophaga pinus (R)
Yellow-rumped warbler, Setophaga coronata
"Myrtle warbler", Setophaga coronata coronata (R) (nesting)
Yellow-throated warbler, Setophaga dominica (A) (R)
Prairie warbler, Setophaga discolor (A) (R)
Black-throated gray warbler, Setophaga nigrescens (A) (R)
Townsend's warbler, Setophaga townsendi (A) (R)
Black-throated green warbler, Setophaga virens
Canada warbler, Cardellina canadensis
Wilson's warbler, Cardellina pusilla

Cardinals and allies
Order: PasseriformesFamily: Cardinalidae

The cardinals are a family of robust, seed-eating birds with strong bills. They are typically associated with open woodland. The sexes usually have distinct plumages. Eleven species have been recorded in North Dakota.

Summer tanager, Piranga rubra (A)
Scarlet tanager, Piranga olivacea
Western tanager, Piranga ludoviciana (R) (nesting)
Northern cardinal, Cardinalis cardinalis
Rose-breasted grosbeak, Pheucticus ludovicianus
Black-headed grosbeak, Pheucticus melanocephalus (R) (nesting east of US Hwy 83)
Blue grosbeak, Passerina caerulea (R) (nesting)
Lazuli bunting, Passerina amoena
Indigo bunting, Passerina cyanea
Painted bunting, Passerina ciris (A) (R)
Dickcissel, Spiza americana

Notes

References

See also
List of birds
Lists of birds by region
List of North American birds

External links
North Dakota Birding Society.

North Dakota